"Father" is the third single from LL Cool J's seventh album, Phenomenon.  It was released on January 13, 1998 for Def Jam Recordings and was produced by the Trackmasters.

"Father", which was an auto-biographical song that detailed LL's abuse from his mother's boyfriend, would prove to be the most successful single from the album, it made it to #18 on the Billboard Hot 100 and became his eighth single to reach #1 on the Hot Rap Singles. It sold 500,000 copies. The song's main sample is "Father Figure" by George Michael.

The music video was directed by Samuel Bayer.

Track listing

A-Side
"Father" (Radio Edit)- 3:57
"Father" (Instrumental)- 4:42

B-Side
"4,3,2,1" (Remix Instrumental)- 5:00
"4,3,2,1" (Instrumental)- 4:15

Charts

Weekly charts

End of year charts

References

1998 singles
LL Cool J songs
Music videos directed by Samuel Bayer
Songs written by LL Cool J
1997 songs
Songs written by George Michael
Song recordings produced by Trackmasters
Def Jam Recordings singles
Songs written by Samuel Barnes (songwriter)
Songs written by Jean-Claude Olivier